Zelenin (feminine: Zelenina) is a Russian-language surname. It may refer to:

Aleksandra Zelenina, Moldovan athlete
Dmitry Zelenin (disambiguation):
Dmitry Konstantinovich Zelenin, Russian ethnographer
Dmitry Vadimovich Zelenin, Russian politician
Oleg Zelenin, Russian footballer
Sergei Zelenin, Russian footballer

Russian-language surnames